The Goderich 35, also known as the Huromic 35, is a Canadian sailboat that was designed by Ted Brewer of Brewer, Walstrom and Associates, as a cruiser and first built in 1977.

Production
The design was built by Huromic Metal Industries Limited in Canada, but it is now out of production.

Design
The Goderich 35 is a recreational keelboat, built predominantly of steel, with wood trim. It has a cutter rig sloop rig, a spooned raked stem, a plumb transom, a keel-mounted rudder controlled by a tiller and a fixed modified long keel, with a cutaway forefoot. It displaces  and carries  of ballast. The hull is made from steel, painted with urethane paint. Some of the boats were built with 37 foot LOAs, using an extended stern overhang and some were built with ketch rigs.

The cutter staysail is mounted on a boom and the design uses no bowsprit.

Below decks sleeping accommodation includes a bow "V"-berth, two main cabin settee berths and a pilot berth aft on the starboard side. The galley is located on the port side, at the foot of the companionway steps. It includes a three-burner stove and  icebox. The head is located forward and has a door for access from the main cabin and one from the forward cabin.

Ventilation is provided by five opening ports and five portlights, plus a main cabin hatch.

The steel hull is constructed from welded radius-rolled sheet steel used in the bilge area, in between flatter sheet steel in the sides and hull bottom.

Operational history
Reviewer Richard Sherwood wrote in 1994, "this steel cutter is built in Canada. Stiffness comes from the beam, as the ballast is moderate. The ballast/displacement ratio is 37 percent. To minimize sweating, the hull is insulated with urethane foam."

Marvin Creamer, a geography professor from New Jersey did a circumnavigation in a Goderich 35, Globe Star, starting 21 December 1982 from Cape May, New Jersey, completing the voyage with use of any instruments, save an hourglass to determine watch lengths. The trip was completed on 17 May 1984, after 18 months, including 11 months at sea.

Another Goderich 35, Nomad, was built with aluminum construction for Ed Arnold in Washington state. It was shipped by road to the US east coast and he sailed it to Europe. On the return voyage Arnold sailed it around Cape Horn and on to Sitka, Alaska. He later used the boat to do a solo circumnavigation, intended to be non-stop. He completed it between 1 October 2001 and 6 September 2002, including a month for repairs at the Royal Cape Yacht Club in Cape Town after hitting an iceberg and a stop in Adelaide, Australia, to have his radar repaired.

See also
List of sailing boat types

Similar sailboats
C&C 34/36
C&C 35
C&C 36R
Cal 35
Cal 35 Cruise
Express 35
Hughes 36
Hughes-Columbia 36
Island Packet 35
Landfall 35
Mirage 35
Niagara 35
Pilot 35
Southern Cross 35

References

Keelboats
1970s sailboat type designs
Sailing yachts
Sailboat type designs by Edward S. Brewer
Sailboat types built by Huromic Metal Industries Limited